MV Varagen is a Ro-Ro vehicle ferry operated by Orkney Ferries.

History
MV Varagen was built by Cochrane Shipbuilders, Selby in 1989. to provide a service between Gills Bay, Near John O’ Groats, and Burwick, the southern tip of South Ronaldsay, Orkney.

On 11th November 2022, MV Varagen ran aground en route to Westray at around 18:45. There were no reports of casualties to crew or passengers. The Varagen made the outbound voyage to Westray but was then escorted back to Kirkwall by another Orkney Ferries vessel to assess any damage.

Service
MV Varagen is normally used on Outer North Isles services, connecting Kirkwall with Eday, Sanday, Stronsay, and Westray.

References

1989 ships
Transport in Orkney
Ships built in Selby
Ferries of Scotland